The 2014 Fresno State Bulldogs football team represented California State University, Fresno in the 2014 NCAA Division I FBS football season. The Bulldogs were led by third-year head coach Tim DeRuyter and played their home games at Bulldog Stadium. They were members of the Mountain West Conference and completed in the West Division. They finished the season 6–8 overall and 5–3 in conference to tie for first place in the West Division, but due to their head-to-head win over San Diego State, they were crowned West Division champions. They lost to Mountain Division champion Boise State in the Mountain West Championship Game. They were invited to the Hawaii Bowl where they lost to Rice.

Personnel

Coaching Staff

Roster

Schedule

Schedule Source:

Game summaries

at No. 15 USC

at Utah

Nebraska

Southern Utah

at New Mexico

San Diego State

at UNLV

at Boise State

Wyoming

San Jose State

at Nevada

Hawai'i

at No. 22 Boise State (MWC Championship Game)

vs. Rice (Hawaii Bowl)

References

Fresno State
Fresno State Bulldogs football seasons
Fresno State Bulldogs football